The 2011 Balkan Athletics Championships was the 64th edition of the annual track and field competition for athletes from the Balkans, organised by Balkan Athletics. It was held at Stadion Hadzhi Dimitar in Sliven, Bulgaria on 2 and 3 July.

Vania Stambolova of Bulgaria was the only athlete to win two individual events, as she topped the podium in the women's 400 metres sprint and 400 metres hurdles. Her team mate Ivet Lalova-Collio won both the individual women's 100 metres and 4 × 100 metres relay.

In the team competition, Greece won the men's section with 159 points to Bulgaria's 157, while Romania topped the women's table with 170 points to Greece's 160.

The original third placer in the men's shot put, Ivan Emilianov of Moldova with 19.38 m, was subsequently disqualified for doping.

Results

Men

Women

References

 Karamarinov the new Balkan Athletics Federations president (archived). European Athletics (3 July 2011). Retrieved 2020-10-30.
Results
 BalkanC Sliven BUL 2 - 3 July 2011 / 64th Balkan Athletic Championships. tilastopaja.org. Retrieved 2020-10-30.
 July 2-3 - Balkan Championships: Sliven (BUL). balkan-athletics.eu. Retrieved 2020-10-30.

2011
Sliven
International athletics competitions hosted by Bulgaria
Balkan Athletics Championships
Balkan Athletics Championships
Balkan Athletics Championships